Lake Brownwood State Park is a state park located on the shore of Lake Brownwood in Brown County, Texas, United States and is administered by the Texas Parks and Wildlife Department. The  537.5 acre park was acquired by deed from the Brown County Water Improvement District No. 1 in 1933. The Civilian Conservation Corps (CCC) developed the park between 1934 and 1942. The park opened in 1938.

History
The citizens of Brown County voted in 1926 to organize the Brown County Water Improvement District for the purpose of creating a reservoir to control flooding along Pecan Bayou. The dam was completed in 1932 and the reservoir filled the same year. In 1933, the Texas State Parks Board acquired the deed for the land for the state park from the water improvement district. Work began on the park in 1933 under work relief programs of the Civil Works Administration. The CCC took over when CCC Company 872 arrived in November 1934 and worked on the park for a year. CCC Company 849 arrived in October 1936 and remained at the park until 1942 when the camp was closed. The National Park Service designed the park and the CCC used locally quarried stone to build the recreation hall, cabins, benches, culverts, picnic tables and fire pits. 

During World War II, the United States Army leased forty acres of land as a recreational area for soldiers stationed at Camp Bowie. The army built a 1,500-man camp with tents, basketball courts, tennis courts and a football field. To honor the soldiers, the State Parks Board changed the name of the park to the "36th Division State Park" between 1946 and 1956. The recreational area is now the Willow Point Campground.

References

External links
 Film featuring Lake Brownwood State Park in the 1950s from the Texas Archive of the Moving Image

Brown County, Texas
Parks in Texas